The 1985 Virginia Slims of Dallas, also known as the VS of Dallas, was a women's tennis tournament played on indoor carpet courts in Dallas, Texas in the United States. It was part of the 1984 Virginia Slims World Championship Series and was played from March 11 through March 17, 1985. First-seeded Martina Navratilova won the singles title.

Finals

Singles
 Martina Navratilova defeated  Chris Evert 6–3, 6–4
 It was Navratilova's 3rd singles title of the year and the 100th of her career.

Doubles
 Barbara Potter /  Sharon Walsh defeated  Marcella Mesker /  Pascale Paradis 5–7, 6–4, 7–6

See also
 Evert–Navratilova rivalry

Notes

References

External links
 ITF tournament edition details
 Tournament draws

Virginia Slims of Dallas
Virginia Slims of Dallas
Virginia
Virginia
Virginia Slims of Dallas
Virginia Slims of Dallas